Lindiwe Benedicta Hendricks (born 29 July 1957 in Vryburg, Northern Cape) is a South African politician and a member of the National Assembly. She has served as Minister of Water and Environmental Affairs in the Department of Water Affairs and Forestry from 22 May 2006 to 10 May 2009.

She previously served as Minister of Minerals and Energy from 2005 to 2006, and Deputy Minister of Trade and Industry from 1999 to 2005. She was a partner of Ngwane & Ngwane Attorneys, a law firm based in Durban, from 1986 to 1988, and was an attorney at the Supreme Court from 1995 to 1999.

References

1957 births
Living people
Government ministers of South Africa
People from Vryburg
Members of the National Assembly of South Africa
African National Congress politicians
Women government ministers of South Africa
Women members of the National Assembly of South Africa